Blyth Valley was a local government district and borough in south-east Northumberland, England, bordering the North Sea and Tyne and Wear.  The two principal towns were Blyth and Cramlington. Other population centres include Seaton Delaval, and Seaton Sluice.

The borough was formed on 1 April 1974 by the merger of the borough of Blyth, part of Seaton Valley urban district and part of the borough of Whitley Bay.

The district council was abolished as part of the 2009 structural changes to local government in England effective from 1 April 2009 with responsibilities being transferred to Northumberland County Council, a unitary authority.

See also
Blyth Valley Borough Council elections

References

External links
Statistics about Blyth Valley from the Office for National Statistics Census 2001

English districts abolished in 2009
Former non-metropolitan districts of Northumberland
Former boroughs in England